Michael Jacques (born January 3, 1961) is an American weightlifter. He competed in the men's lightweight event at the 1988 Summer Olympics.

References

External links
 

1961 births
Living people
American male weightlifters
Olympic weightlifters of the United States
Weightlifters at the 1988 Summer Olympics
People from St. Albans, Vermont
20th-century American people
21st-century American people